The Edinburgh Mela is an annual multi-cultural festival held in Edinburgh, Scotland, and is one of the 12 festivals that make up the Edinburgh Festival.  The first mela, a Sanskrit word meaning "gathering" or "to meet", was held in 1995 at Meadowbank Stadium, and was organised by members of the city's minority ethnic communities. The festival moved to Pilrig Park in 2000, and to Leith Links in 2010. Running over three days in September, the event attracts around  20 to 25,000 people each year.

History

Origins of the Mela
Melas are south Asian events which have spread around the world from the south Asian subcontinent. Mela means 'gathering' and can describe festival, market, trade event, religious gathering and more. Melas are celebrated with music, dance, theatre, fashion, food and stalls. Melas are distinguished by their bringing together of south Asian cultures and those of other countries when promoted by south Asian Diasporas abroad. Melas first came to Britain in the late eighties.

Mela in Edinburgh
In 1995 people from Bangladesh, India, Pakistan and other traditions of the sub-continent established a mela in Edinburgh. Chinese, African, and other groups were also involved. The first festival was held in Meadowbank Stadium, London Road, Edinburgh. The Edinburgh Mela Company formed in 1996.

The Board of Directors
Sir Geoff Palmer (Chair)
Foysol Choudhury MBE
Shami Khan
Rajnish Singh
Graham Clark
Azra Sharif-Qayyum
Saad Nazir
Jessica Yang
Vimal DSouza
Shahid Riaz
Sonia Aksi

Artistic Directors
Chris Purnell 2011–present
Stephen Stenning 2010 - 2011
Liam Sinclair 2007 - 2010
Jazz Singh 2005 - 2006

Locations
Leith Links 2010 – present
Pilrig Park 2000-2007 & 2009
Ocean Terminal 2008
Meadowbank Stadium 1995-1999

Music Stages
One of the main attractions of this festival is its concerts and shows. There are 3 main stages: 2 are outdoors, offering headline shows like music and dance performances.

Food

Bars
Most of the food tents offers drinks too, but there are also dedicated bars serving beers, spirits, and soft drinks throughout the day.

Shopping
A selection of stalls selling the traditional dress, jewelry, and hand-made products from different countries around the world.

Kidzone
The kids’ area is divided in two. On one side attractions often include trampolines and bouncy castles. On the other, free activities for children.

References

Mela
1995 establishments in Scotland
Recurring events established in 1995
Festivals of multiculturalism
Cultural festivals in Scotland
Arts festivals in Scotland
Festivals in Edinburgh
Theatre in Scotland